James Lewis Carter Ford (probably June 24, 1923 – July 16, 2013) was an American blues musician, using the name T-Model Ford. Unable to remember his exact date of birth, he began his musical career in his early 70s, and continuously recorded for the Fat Possum label, then switched to Alive Naturalsound Records. His musical style combined the rawness of Delta blues with Chicago blues and juke joint blues styles.

Biography
According to records, Ford was born in Forest, Mississippi, between 1921 and 1925. Researchers Bob Eagle and Eric LeBlanc indicate June 24, 1923, though at the time of his death his record company gave his age as 94, suggesting a birth in 1918 or 1919. According to an interview recorded for his album "The Ladies Man", Ford's passport gives his date of birth as June 24, 1921 but his Mississippi driver's licence gives it as June 27, 1924. Starting with an abusive father who had permanently injured him at eleven, Ford lived his entire life in a distressed and violent environment, towards which he was quite indifferent.

Ford, an illiterate, worked in various blue collar jobs as early as his preteen years, such as plowing fields, working at a sawmill, and later in life becoming a lumber company foreman and then a truck driver. At this time, Ford was sentenced to ten years on a chain gang for murder. Allegedly, Ford was able to reduce his sentence to two years. He spent many of his years following his release in conflicts with law enforcement.

Ford lived in Greenville, Mississippi and for a time wrote an advice column for Arthur magazine. Reportedly, he had twenty six children.

According to music writer Will Hodgkinson, who met and interviewed Ford for his book Guitar Man, Ford took up the guitar when his fifth wife left him and gave him a guitar as a leaving present. Ford trained himself without being able to read music or guitar tabs. Hodgkinson observed that Ford could not explain his technique. He simply worked out a way of playing that sounded like the guitarists he admired — Muddy Waters and Howlin' Wolf.

Ford toured juke joints and other venues, for a while opening for Buddy Guy. In 1995, he was discovered by Matthew Johnson of Fat Possum Records, under which he released five albums from 1997 to 2008.

In 1997 T-Model Ford was featured in a 26-minute documentary JUKE  Directed by Mary Flannery and produced by Yellow Cat Productions. T-Model appeared along with Farmer John and John Horton.

Since 2008, Ford worked with the Seattle-based band, GravelRoad.  The project began as a single event, with Ford needing assistance to play the Deep Blues Festival in Minnesota in July 2008.  GravelRoad, longtime fans of Ford and performers already scheduled for the festival, agreed to provide support for a ten-show United States tour for Ford through July.

Ford had a pacemaker inserted at the end of that tour, but appeared on stage again with GravelRoad in 2008, 2009 and 2010. He suffered a stroke in early 2010, but despite difficulty with right-hand mobility, managed to complete a successful tour with GravelRoad. This tour concluded with an  appearance at Pickathon Festival. Ford and GravelRoad opened the third day of the All Tomorrow's Parties Festival, in New York over Labor Day weekend, 2010, curated by American independent film-maker Jim Jarmusch.

GravelRoad backed Ford on his 2010 and 2011 albums, The Ladies Man and Taledragger, both released by Alive Naturalsound Records.

Ford suffered a second stroke in the summer of 2012 that limited his public appearances.  However, he was able to perform at that year's King Biscuit Blues Festival in October.

On July 16, 2013, Fat Possum announced that Ford died at home in Greenville of respiratory failure, after a prolonged illness.

The Mount Zion Memorial Fund, organised the placing of a headstone for Ford at Green Lawn Memorial Gardens Cemetery, near Greenville, Mississippi. The ceremony was on May 31, 2014. The grave marker was designed by Amos Harvey and engraved by Alan Orlicek.

Discography
 Pee-Wee Get My Gun - 1997 (Fat Possum)
 You Better Keep Still - 1999 (Fat Possum)
 She Ain't None of Your'n - 2000 (Fat Possum)
 Bad Man - 2002 (Fat Possum)
 Don't Get Out Talkin' It - 2008 (Fat Possum)
 Jack Daniel Time - 2008 (Mudpuppy)
 The Ladies Man - 2010 (Alive Naturalsound)
 Taledragger - 2011 (Alive Naturalsound)
 I Was Born In A Swamp - 2021 (Alive Naturalsound)

References

External links
T-Model Ford page from Fat Possum Records site
T-Model Ford page from Alive Naturalsound Records site

London gig review April 2007
interview with T Model Ford
T Model Ford video on BBC
Interview

1920s births
2013 deaths
American blues guitarists
American male guitarists
Fat Possum Records artists
Blues musicians from Mississippi
People from Forest, Mississippi
Alive Naturalsound Records artists
Guitarists from Mississippi
20th-century American guitarists
Delta blues musicians
African-American guitarists
20th-century African-American male singers
21st-century African-American male singers